Hauk Erlendssøn Aabel (21 April 1869 – 12 December 1961) was a popular Norwegian comedian and actor in Norwegian and Swedish silent film.

Career
Aabel made his début on stage on 11 October 1897 at the Christiania Theatre in Oslo, and was a prominent actor in the Norwegian theatre. In 1917, he began appearing in silent films in Sweden. He then returned to Norway in 1927, where he worked in many films, including several after the advent of sound. He made his last film in 1939, aged 72.

Hauk Aabel was a reserve officer in the Norwegian Army, with the rank of First Lieutenant.

He was the informant who provided sounding material to the pioneering linguistic study of Haugen and Joos in 1952, called Tone and Intonation in East Norwegian.

His son Per Aabel was also a popular comic actor in Norwegian films, and his son Andreas Aabel was an actor and translator. Aabel died in 1961.

Works 

 Hauk Aabel av Erling Alm-Vik i Norske scenekunstnere 1918
 Moro var det lell! – Mine første tyve år på scenen 1935
 Gode gamle dager 1949

References

External links

1867 births
1961 deaths
People from Førde
Norwegian male comedians
Norwegian male stage actors
Norwegian male film actors
Norwegian male silent film actors
20th-century Norwegian male actors
Norwegian Army personnel
19th-century Norwegian male actors